Adam Jonathan Dutkiewicz (born April 4, 1977) is an American musician, recording engineer, songwriter, and music producer, best known as the lead guitarist and backup vocalist from Massachusetts metalcore bands Killswitch Engage, Aftershock, and Times of Grace, as well as the guitarist and co-lead vocalist for the melodic death metal supergroup Serpentine Dominion.

Biography 
Dutkiewicz, of Polish, Austrian, Scottish, and English descent, was born and grew up in Westhampton, Massachusetts. Dutkiewicz attended Hampshire Regional High School. Dutkiewicz also later attended the Berklee College of Music in Boston, studying production, audio engineering, and bass guitar.  While at college, he began playing in the band Aftershock with friend Joel Stroetzel. Stroetzel would later join Dutkiewicz, Mike D'Antonio, and Jesse Leach in forming Killswitch Engage. Dutkiewicz was the drummer of Killswitch Engage, until the release of its second album, Alive or Just Breathing, when he moved to guitars, and Tom Gomes became the band's drummer.

He has assumed the role of producer on all of Killswitch Engage's records, except on their second self-titled album Killswitch Engage, which was released June 30, 2009. For this album he took on the job of co-producer alongside Brendan O'Brien (known for his work with AC/DC, The Offspring, Pearl Jam, Rage Against the Machine, Incubus, Mastodon, and Stone Temple Pilots). Adam has also produced for the bands  As I Lay Dying, Underøath, The Devil Wears Prada, The Acacia Strain, Unearth, All That Remains, From Autumn to Ashes, Johnny Truant, Parkway Drive, The Agony Scene, Every Time I Die and others.  He has been compared to Ross Robinson, producer of many nu metal albums, because of his influence on modern metal and shaping the sound of melodic metalcore. He is also an engineer for Zing Recording Studios, which has produced for numerous artists, including several from Tooth & Nail Records and its heavy metal sub-label Solid State Records.

In 2016, Adam formed Serpentine Dominion also consisting George "Corpsegrinder" Fisher and Shannon Lucas.

Equipment

Guitars
Dutkiewicz has been a longtime player of Caparison Guitars mostly using the Caparison PLM-3, a discontinued model, with EMG pickups (EMG 85 in the bridge, and two EMG SA single coils in the middle and neck positions) and DR Tite-Fit .012-.052 strings. He also uses the Caparison Dellinger, Horus, TAT, and Angelus models. He is quoted as saying that he likes the guitars because they have a very "strat-like neck." Ever since 2007, he has been seen using various models and brands, but still uses Caparison for tracking in the studio.

In 2008 shows, Dutkiewicz used a black Parker Fly with an EMG 81/EMG 85 set for pickups. Atop this, he used a custom Caparison, modeled after the Dellinger model. He previously used Parker Guitars for their light weight so as to avoid worsening his back problems, but ended his endorsement due to quality issues after getting his signature model. Sometime in 2008, he switched to using a stock PRS Guitars Custom 22, which he used for a few years. In the video for "In Due Time", Dutkiewicz can be seen using an EVH Wolfgang Hardtail. He has since then switched to EVH Wolfgangs full-time. The modifications done to the Wolfgangs involve removing the neck pickup, pickup selector switch, and tone knob, replacing the Schaller fine-tuning stop-tail piece with a standard stop-tail piece, replacing the locking nut with a standard nut, and installing locking tuners.

In 2015, Dutkiewicz officially re-joined Caparison Guitars. He now also uses Fishman Fluence Modern pickups. He uses his signature model, the Caparison Metal Machine. It is based on the TAT Special FX with Fishman Fluence Killswitch Engage Signature pickup in the bridge position. He left out the neck pickup for more wood mass in the guitar.

Amplification and effects
Dutkiewicz has used a wide variety of amps throughout his career, including the Mesa Boogie Roadster and Triple Rectifier heads, a Marshall JCM900, a modified Soldano SLO-100, and a Hughes and Kettner TriAmp MKII, which he did not like for metal because he said it "didn't hold together well." He has also used the Framus Cobra and Dragon, the Peavey 5150, the Splawn Nitro, the Diezel VH4, and the Fuchs Viper for distorted tones, and the Fender Twin '65 Reverb and Vox AC30 for clean tones. He is currently endorsed by Laney Amplification, used their Ironheart series of amplifiers and currently using Tony Iommi’s signature amplifier TI-100.

In his current live amp rig, he uses both Laney amps, making use of a Laney Iommi head with a Celestion Vintage 30-loaded Laney Iommi 4x12 cabinet for his distorted tones, and a Laney Lionheart 1x12 combo for clean tones.

For his current live effects rig, he makes use of a Maxon OD808 Overdrive, Maxon AD-9 delay, Maxon CP-9 Pro+ compressor, Boss Corporation NS-2 Noise Suppressor, Boss ABY switcher, Jet City JetDirect DI box, and a Korg DTR2000 tuner. For wireless, he uses an Audio-Technica 5000 Series.

Dutkiewicz currently uses D'Addario EXL115 (.011 - .049) string sets with Intune 1.14mm picks.

Stage show

Joel Stroetzel stated about Adam Dutkiewicz's stage personality saying: "Adam likes to take the piss out of things. Just wants to have a good time—kind of act like an asshole, but in a funny way. He likes to get people going, egg the crowd on. He gets up there and calls the crowd ‘pussies’ and all this stuff. But coming from a guy wearing short shorts and a cape, you gotta take things like that in stride."

Jesse Leach has stated about Dutkiewicz's stage attire: "That's his sort of middle finger to everybody, to all the people who act very tough and think metal has to be doom and gloom and trying to be a cool or tough guy, that's his punk rock way."

Personal life
Dutkiewicz used to be straight edge.

On February 10, 2015, Dutkiewicz was a contestant on the CBS game show The Price Is Right where he won $51,832 in prizes including a 2015 Honda Fit, a 2015 Nissan Frontier, a small trailer, and a trip to Borrego Springs.

Discography

Aftershock

 Letters (1997) – drums
 Through the Looking Glass (2000) – lead guitar, vocals

Sweatpant Boners
 Cruisin' With the Masters (2002) – drums

Burn Your Wishes
Split EP w/ The Awards (2003)- guitar

Killswitch Engage

 Killswitch Engage (2000) – drums, backing vocals, production
 Alive or Just Breathing (2002) – drums, piano, guitar, backing vocals, production
 The End of Heartache (2004) – lead guitar, additional percussion, backing vocals, production
 As Daylight Dies (2006) – lead guitar, vocals, co-production
 Killswitch Engage (2009) – guitar, backing vocals, co-production
 Disarm the Descent (2013) – guitar, vocals, production
 Incarnate (2016) – guitar, backing vocals, production
 Atonement (2019) – guitar, vocals, production

Times of Grace

 The Hymn of a Broken Man (2011) – vocals, guitars, drums, bass, production
 Songs of Loss and Separation (2021) – vocals, guitars, drums, bass, production

Serpentine Dominion
 Serpentine Dominion (2016) – guitars, bass, backing vocals, production

Other appearances
Total Brutal by Austrian Death Machine (2008) – production, guitar solo in track "Come with Me If You Want to Live"
"A Song for Chi" by Various (2009) – guitars

As producer 
 The Acacia Strain – ...And Life Is Very Long, 3750, The Dead Walk
 All That Remains – Behind Silence and Solitude, This Darkened Heart, The Fall of Ideals, For We Are Many, A War You Cannot Win
 Arma Angelus – Where Sleeplessness Is Rest from Nightmares
 As I Lay Dying – An Ocean Between Us, The Powerless Rise, Decas
 August Burns Red – Thrill Seeker
 Cannae – Horror
 From Autumn to Ashes – Too Bad You're Beautiful
 He Is Legend – I Am Hollywood
 Johnny Truant – In the Library of Horrific Events
 Norma Jean – Bless the Martyr and Kiss the Child
 Parkway Drive – Killing with a Smile, Horizons
 Shadows Fall – Somber Eyes to the Sky, Fire from the Sky
 Underoath – Define the Great Line, Lost in the Sound of Separation
 Unearth – The Stings of Conscience, Endless, The Oncoming Storm, The March, Darkness in the Light
 The Agony Scene – The Agony Scene
 The Devil Wears Prada – Dead Throne, 8:18

As mixer 
 Caliban: The Awakening, Say Hello to Tragedy

References

External links
 Adam Dutkiewicz talks about his production philosophies
 Adam Dutkiewicz's 2005 Killswitch Engage guitar rig on GuitarGeek.Com
Burn Your Wishes-side project

1977 births
American baritones
American heavy metal guitarists
American heavy metal singers
American people of Polish descent
Record producers from Massachusetts
Berklee College of Music alumni
Death metal musicians
Living people
American male guitarists
People from Westhampton, Massachusetts
Killswitch Engage members
Aftershock (band) members
Shadows Fall members
21st-century American singers
21st-century American guitarists
21st-century American male singers
Times of Grace members
Serpentine Dominion members